Nakum ("House of the pot") is a Mesoamerican archaeological site, and a former ceremonial center and city of the pre-Columbian Maya civilization. It is located in the northeastern portion of the Petén Basin region, in the modern-day Guatemalan department of Petén. The northeastern Petén region contains a good number of other significant Maya sites, and Nakum is one of the three sites forming the Cultural Triangle of  "Yaxha-Nakum-Naranjo". Its main features include an abundance of  visibly restored architecture, and the roof comb of the site's main temple structure is one of the best-preserved outside Tikal.

History

This city has evidence of occupation dating from the Middle Preclassic period of Mesoamerican chronology. For the most part of the Classic period, Nakum appeared to be subordinate to Tikal. Nakum particularly flourished during the Late Classic (c. 8th century—10th century), due to its strategic situation north of Holmul river which was an important trade and communication route during this era. All the visible architecture belongs to this period, there are 15 stelae, Structure A with a triadic top, form along with structure C an astronomical complex. Structure V has vaults and vertical walls. Outside Tikal, it shows the largest corpus of ancient Maya script graffiti in a Classic Maya site. Nakum reached its apogee in the Terminal Classic period and might have achieved political independence around this time. However, it was abandoned soon after its apogee.

Site description and architecture 
The site of Nakum may be divided into two main sectors, North and South, connected by a causeway named after Perigny.  The Northern sector contains many impressive buildings, but it has been comparatively little investigated. The Southern sector is larger in extent, and contains the main Acropolis together with 11 patios and several classes of structures, including a 44-room "palace" (known as the D building). In the center of the southern complex is another elevated Acropolis which provides a clear overview of the other important structures.  This latter Acropolis contains the building known as Structure Y, which by its location can be presumed to have served as the main residential complex for the site's main ruler.

The fact that the main Acropolis was such an important and imposing structure clearly sends a message, in this site the political aspects had considerable weight.  In comparison with the religious architecture which is located at a lower level.   The Temples located in the south of sector at the Central Plaza (Temple A, B and C) form a clear triangle pointing to the north.
Like in Tikal the Central Plaza of Nakum is oriented towards the four directions and located at the south there is the complex of palaces of the city.  Since it is the main plaza of the city it is possible that from the Palace D the ruler and the royals observed the rituals and performances that took place at the plaza.  Next is the East Plaza (it holds Temple V) which for some unknown reason was abandoned, since the Temple is located at the East it clearly shows that particular plaza was related to the sun deity.  Finally the South East Plaza (it holds Temple U) and it has a direct relationship with the main Acropolis.

Discovery 
The site today known as Nakum was re-discovered in 1905 by Maurice de Périgny. He referred to it as Nacun. Since then several archaeological and restorative expeditions have been conducted at the site, including a Peabody museum expedition in 1909-1910 and an official restoration by Guatemalan authorities which commenced in 1990.

Notes

References

External links
Yaxha and Nakum information by Mayakultur.de 
Yaxhá-Nakum-Naranjo Natural Monument description at ParksWatch site of this protected area within Maya Biosphere Reserve
 Nakum Description and Photo Galleries
Analisis de la Arquitectura Expuesta del Sitio Prehispanico Nakum (Coromac-Gonzalez-Mendez-Tobar 2006)  Facultad de Arquitectura de la Universitad San Carlos de Guatemala

Maya sites in Petén Department
Archaeological sites in Guatemala
Former populated places in Guatemala